Matty Matheson: A Cookbook is a 2018 cookbook by Canadian chef Matty Matheson. It was named a New York Times Bestseller.

Reception
The book was released to positive reviews. Esquire named it one of the best cookbooks of 2018.

References 

Canadian cookbooks
2018 non-fiction books